High Steppers is a 1926 American silent drama film produced and directed by Edwin Carewe and distributed by First National Pictures. The film is based on the novel Heirs Apparent by Philip Gibbs.

Plot 
Julian Perryam (Lloyd Hughes) gets thrown out of Oxford University and returns to the family estate outside London. He discovers that his sister and his mother are caught up in the "jazz" life and their father, who's the editor of a tabloid scandal rag, is too busy to notice. He also discovers that his sister is in love with the scoundrel son of his father's publisher, Victor Buckland. Learning that Buckland is actually an embezzler, Julian gets a job as a reporter on a muckraking publication and sets out to expose Buckland.

Cast 
 Lloyd Hughes as Julian Perryam
 Mary Astor as Audrey Nye
 Dolores del Río as Evelyn Iffield
 Rita Carewe as Janette Perryam
 John T. Murray as Cyril Buckland
 Edwards Davis as Victor Buckland

References

External links 
 

1926 films
1926 drama films
Silent American drama films
American silent feature films
American black-and-white films
1920s English-language films
Films based on British novels
First National Pictures films
Films directed by Edwin Carewe
1920s American films